Oshin is a 1983–1984 Japanese morning television drama series.

Oshin may also refer to:
Oshin (album), 2012 album by American rock band DIIV

Given name
Oshin of Lampron (fl. 1070s), Armenian nobleman
Oshin, King of Armenia (1282–1320), king of the Armenian Kingdom of Cilicia
Oshin of Korikos (died 1329), regent of the Armenian Kingdom of Cilicia
Oshin Sahakian (born 1986), Iranian basketball player of Armenian descent

Surname
Bimbo Oshin (born 1971), Nigerian actress
Tope Oshin (born 1979), Nigerian film and television director

See also
Osin, a surname
Samuel Oschin (1914–2003), American entrepreneur